Under Attack is the seventh album by hardcore punk band The Casualties on the record label Side One Dummy Records.

This album entered the Billboard 200 album charts at number 200. Total sales for its first week were 6,023 units.

The words of the tattoos on the hands of the person on the front cover (Johnny Ruin) say "Reje" and "Cted" spelling "REJECTED".

Reception

Track listing

The title track of this album is featured on the 2006 Vans Warped Tour compilation.

Chart positions

2006 albums
The Casualties albums
SideOneDummy Records albums